Iridomyrmex cyaneus is a species of ant in the genus Iridomyrmex. Described by Wheeler in 1915, these ants prefer dry desert like habitats in Australia, ranging from New South Wales to South Australia and Western Australia.

References

Iridomyrmex
Hymenoptera of Australia
Insects described in 1915